Pardosa pullata is a species of spiders from genus Pardosa in the family Lycosidae. It was described by Clerck, in 1757.

Subspecies 
Pardosa pullata has a subspecies:
 Pardosa pullata jugorum

References 

pullata
Spiders described in 1757
Taxa named by Carl Alexander Clerck